DPNI may refer to:
 Movement Against Illegal Immigration
 DpnI, a Type IIM restriction enzyme which digests methylated DNA